Todor Kolev (born 22 September 1989 in Varna) is a Bulgarian former footballer who played as a midfielder. He played as a left winger but could also play as a left back.

Career
In September 2007 it was noticed that the Youth Academy forward Todor Kolev agreed the conditions of his first professional contract with the club which will be effective for five years. It was good news for the fans, because Todor he was expected as a great talent in the recent history of the club.

His first official match was on 9 December 2007 against Vidima-Rakovski Sevlievo.  The result of the match was 7:0 with a win for Cherno More. In this day Kolev scored his first goal – in the 75th minute from a penalty kick for 6:0. The forward played 10 matches in 2007–08 and scored 2 goals.

On 30 June 2017, Kolev signed a 1-year contract with Montana.  He left the club at the end of the season when his contract expired.  In June 2018, Kolev returned to Dobrudzha Dobrich.

International career

Bulgaria U19
Kolev played for Bulgaria national under-19 football team. With the team he plays at 2008 UEFA European Under-19 Football Championship in Czech Republic.

Bulgaria U21
In August 2008 the Bulgarian national under-21 coach Ivan Kolev called Todor up for Bulgaria national under-21 football team for qualified for 2009 UEFA European Under-21 Football Championship with Ireland U21 and Montenegro U21. On 5 September 2008 he made his official debut for Bulgaria U21 against Ireland U21. He played for 27 minutes. The result of the match was a 2:0 win for Bulgaria.

References

External links
 
 

1989 births
Living people
Sportspeople from Varna, Bulgaria
Bulgarian footballers
Bulgaria youth international footballers
Bulgaria under-21 international footballers
First Professional Football League (Bulgaria) players
Second Professional Football League (Bulgaria) players
Association football wingers
Association football fullbacks
PFC Cherno More Varna players
PFC Vidima-Rakovski Sevlievo players
FC Lyubimets players
PFC Kaliakra Kavarna players
PFC Marek Dupnitsa players
PFC Dobrudzha Dobrich players
FC Montana players